The 1937 Tipperary Senior Hurling Championship was the 46th staging of the Tipperary Senior Hurling Championship since its establishment by the Tipperary County Board in 1887.

Moycarkey-Borris won the championship after a 7–06 to 6–02 win over Cashel King Cormacs in the final. It was the club's fifth title as Moycarkey-Borris but the ninth title to be claimed by a team representing the area.

References

Tipperary
Tipperary Senior Hurling Championship